Ashland is the name of the plantation of the 19th-century Kentucky statesman Henry Clay, located in Lexington, Kentucky, in the central Bluegrass region of the state. The buildings were built by enslaved African Americans, and enslaved people grew and harvested hemp, farmed livestock, and cooked and cleaned for the Clays.

Ashland is a registered National Historic Landmark. The Ashland Stakes, a Thoroughbred horse race at Keeneland Race Course that has run annually since the race course first opened in 1936, was named for the historically important estate.

History of the estate
Henry Clay came to Lexington, Kentucky from Virginia in 1797. In 1804, he began buying land for the plantation outside the city's limits.

Among the people enslaved by the Clays were Aaron Dupuy and Charlotte Dupuy as well as their children Charles and Mary Ann Dupuy. Clay took them with him to Washington D.C. when his congressional term began in 1810, and they were held there for nearly two decades. In 1829, 28 years before the more famous Dred Scott challenge, Charlotte Dupuy sued Henry Clay for her freedom and that of her two children in Washington D.C. circuit court. She was ordered to stay in Washington while the court case proceeded, and lived there for 18 months, working for Martin Van Buren, the next Secretary of State. Clay took her husband Aaron Dupuy and her children Charles and Mary Ann Dupuy with him when he returned to Ashland. The court ruled against Dupuy, and when she refused to return voluntarily to Kentucky, Clay had her arrested. Clay had Dupuy renditioned to New Orleans and had her held by his daughter and son-in-law, where she was enslaved for another decade. Finally, in 1840, Clay freed Charlotte and her daughter Mary Ann Dupuy, and in 1844, he freed her son Charles Dupuy.

The mansion

Using the profits of his forced-labor farming, Henry Clay used enslaved people to build his Federal style house in around 1806 (see Federal architecture). He had two wings added between 1811 and 1814, designed for him by Benjamin Latrobe. Inferior building materials, particularly a porous type of brick, resulted in an unstable structure. The building was likely damaged in the New Madrid earthquake and aftershocks of 1811–12. Clay's many repairs could never completely stabilize the house.

Later ownership

Clay divided the Ashland estate among three sons. James Clay had the house razed in 1854, and rebuilding was completed by 1857. Local architect Thomas Lewinski designed the new structure, which used features of the original house: the footprint and foundation, floorplan, and massing, but Lewinski modernized the house stylistically. With many Italianate features, the resulting mansion is a mix of Federal architecture and Italianate details. Inside, James Clay employed Greek Revival features and decorated the home lavishly (see:Victorian decorative arts) with imported furnishings purchased in New York City. James Clay rebuilt the house and his family lived there until his death in 1864. His widow Susan Jacob Clay sold the estate in 1866.

Kentucky University purchased Ashland and used it as part of its campus.  University founder and regent John Bryan Bowman occupied the mansion.  The Agricultural and Mechanical College (Kentucky A & M) sat on Clay's former farm. During the Kentucky University period, Regent John Bowman used part of the mansion to house and display the University Natural History Museum.

Kentucky University split into what became Transylvania University and the University of Kentucky, and sold Ashland in 1882.

They remodeled and modernized the house, updating it with gas lighting (later, electricity), indoor plumbing, and telephone service. Their eldest daughter Nannette McDowell Bullock continued to occupy Ashland until her death in 1948. She founded the Henry Clay Memorial Foundation, which purchased and preserved Ashland. The historic house museum opened to the public in 1950.

Plantation name

It is unclear whether Henry Clay named the plantation or retained a prior name, but he was referring to his estate as "Ashland" by 1809. The name derives from the ash forest that stood at the site. Clay and his family lived at Ashland from approximately 1806 until his death in 1852 (his widow Lucretia Clay moved out in 1854). His political career led Clay to spend most of the years between 1810 and 1829 in Washington, D.C.

Several cities, the city of Ashland, Kentucky, in Boyd County, the city of Ashland, Missouri, in Boone County and the city of Ashland, Wisconsin, in Ashland County, were named in honor of the estate. The borough of Ashland, Pennsylvania, in Schuylkill County, an anthracite coal mining town, was named in honor of the estate as well.

See also 
 Ashland Park
 Dr. Henry Clay House
 Henry Clay's Law Office
 National Register of Historic Places listings in Fayette County, Kentucky

Notes

References
1 Clay's first purchase was a  tract.  Contract at Ashland, The Henry Clay Estate.
2 Clay put a notice in a local paper asking for the return of a lost horse and listed his home as Ashland.

Further reading
Archives of Ashland, The Henry Clay Estate, Lexington, KY
Brooks, Eric.  Ashland: The Henry Clay Estate.  Images of America Series.  Charleston, SC: Arcadia Publishing, 2007
Remini, Robert V.  Henry Clay: Statesman For The Union.   New York: W.W. Norton, 1991.
Clay Family Papers, Manuscript Division, Library of Congress
University of Kentucky Special Collections.
Transylvania University, Special Collections.
James F. Hopkins, editor, The Papers of Henry Clay. Mary W.M. Hargreaves, associate editor.  Lexington, KY: University of Kentucky Press, 1959–1992.  (v. 6)
Fazio, Michael W. and Patrick A. Snadon.  The Domestic Architecture of Benjamin Henry Latrobe.  Baltimore : Johns Hopkins University Press, 2006.  
Hopkins, James F. A History of the Hemp Industry in Kentucky, Lexington, KY: University of Kentucky Press, 1998.

External links
Official Website
National Park Service Website of the House
"Henry Clay, Presidential Contender" from C-SPAN's The Contenders, broadcast from Ashland

Houses completed in 1814
Henry Clay
National Historic Landmarks in Kentucky
Historic house museums in Kentucky
Plantations in Kentucky
Plantation houses in Kentucky
Museums in Lexington, Kentucky
Museums established in 1950
Houses on the National Register of Historic Places in Kentucky
National Register of Historic Places in Lexington, Kentucky
Houses in Lexington, Kentucky
Benjamin Henry Latrobe buildings and structures
1950 establishments in Kentucky
History of slavery in Kentucky
1814 establishments in Kentucky
Italianate architecture in Kentucky